Natalie A. Schilling (also known as Natalie Schilling-Estes) is a Professor in the Department of Linguistics at Georgetown University. 

Schilling received her PhD and BA from the University of North Carolina at Chapel Hill and her MA from North Carolina State University. Her 1996 PhD dissertation is entitled, The Linguistic and Sociolinguistic Status of /ay/ in Outer Banks English.

She is an expert in sociolinguistics and forensic linguistics. In collaboration with Walt Wolfram, she played an important role in documenting the High Tider variety of North Carolina English. Fictionalized characters based on her have appeared in the TV shows Criminal Minds and Manhunt.

In 2022, she was elected a fellow of the Linguistic Society of America.

References

Selected publications 
 Wolfram, Walt & Natalie Schilling. 1997. Hoi Toide on the Outer Banks. University of North Carolina Press.

External links 
 

Linguists from the United States
Women linguists
Georgetown University faculty
Living people
Year of birth missing (living people)
University of North Carolina at Chapel Hill alumni
Fellows of the Linguistic Society of America